Edwin Cole Bearss (26 June 192315 September 2020) was a historian of the American Civil War, tour guide, and United States Marine Corps veteran of World War II.

Personal life
On 26 June 1923, Edwin Cole Bearss was born in Billings, Montana.  He was raised working on his grandfather's ranch near Hardin, Montana, and attended a one-room school in Sarpy, Montana.

On 30 July 1958, Bearss married author and teacher Margie Riddle of Mississippi (born ), and the two had three children: Sara in 1960, Edwin Jr. in 1962, and Mary in 1965.  In 2002, the couple lived in Arlington, Virginia; Margie died  and Bearss died on 15 September 2020.

Education
Bearss was accepted to St. John's Military Academy in Delafield, Wisconsin in 1937, and graduated from Hardin High School in 1941.  He earned his Bachelor of Science in Foreign Service from Georgetown University in 1949, and his Master of Arts from Indiana University in 1955 (with a thesis on Patrick Cleburne).  Bearss earned his degrees courtesy of the G.I. Bill.

In February 2005, Bearss was awarded an honorary degree from Lincoln College in Lincoln, Illinois; Gettysburg College did the same in 2010.

Military service
Bearss enlisted in the United States Marine Corps in 1941.  During World War II, he served in the 3rd Marine Raider Battalion; he fought in the Guadalcanal and New Britain campaigns with the 1st Marine Division.  In 1943, Bearss caught malaria in the South Pacific, and was sent to New Zealand to recover.  On 2 January 1944 with the 3rd Battalion, 7th Marines at the Battle of Cape Gloucester, Bearss was hit by Imperial Japanese Army machine-gun fire that broke both of his arms and injured his heel and buttocks; after spending the next 26 months in hospital, he left the Marines in March 1946 with the rank of corporal.

History career

In 1955, Bearss began working for the National Park Service (NPS) in Vicksburg, Mississippi. He prepared historical studies for the Interior Department agency and founded the Mississippi Civil War Roundtable. He also found two lost forts in Grand Gulf, Mississippi, and was party to "the establishment of Grand Gulf as a state military monument." Bearss was the NPS' chief historian from 1981–1994, and "special assistant to the director for military sites" until 1995; in 1991, he was made the NPS' chief historian of military sites. Bearss was also a commentator featured in the Ken Burns series, The Civil War.

Bearss retired from the NPS on 30 September 1995, though he continued to lead tours of ACW battlefields for the Smithsonian Institution, the National Geographic Society, the National Trust for Historic Preservation, and Civil War Roundtables.  The NPS awarded him the unique title of National Park Service Historian Emeritus.  Frances and Roger G. Kennedy endowed the Bearss Fellowship Award in honor of the former chief-historian; it "supports NPS employees' graduate-level studies in American History or American Studies and is administered in partnership with the National Park Foundation."

Recognition
The Company of Military Historians made Bearss a fellow of that group in 1964, and he received the Nevins-Freeman Award in 1980 for his work on American Civil War (ACW) history.  Three years later, the Department of the Interior awarded him the Distinguished Service Award, and it was followed by a commendation from the United States Secretary of the Army in 1985.  In 2011, Bearss received The Lincoln Forum's Richard Nelson Current Award of Achievement acknowledging his "contributions to the spirit of [Abraham] Lincoln in both word and deed."  On 23 April 2015, US Representative Gerry Connolly (VA) introduced bill  H.R.2059 to award Bearss the Congressional Gold Medal "in recognition of his contributions to preservation of American Civil War history and continued efforts to bring our nation's history alive for new generations through his interpretive storytelling."  In June 2018, the American Battlefield Trust awarded Bearss its first Lifetime Achievement Award "for his many decades dedicated to researching and relating the nation’s past to millions of people, as well as his advocacy for battlefield preservation."

Publications

References

Further reading

External links

 

1923 births
2020 deaths
American male non-fiction writers
American military historians
historians of the American Civil War
Indiana University alumni
military personnel from Montana
National Park Service personnel
United States Marine Corps non-commissioned officers
United States Marine Corps personnel of World War II
Walsh School of Foreign Service alumni
writers from Billings, Montana